Elizabeth Joan Jennings  (18 July 1926 – 26 October 2001) was an English poet.

Life and career
Jennings was born at The Bungalow, Tower Road, Skirbeck, Boston, Lincolnshire, younger daughter of physician Henry Cecil Jennings (1893-1967), MA, BSc (Oxon.), MB BS (Lond.), DPH, medical officer of health for Oxfordshire, and (Helen) Mary, née Turner. When she was six, her family moved to Oxford, where she remained for the rest of her life. There she later attended St Anne's College.  After graduation, she became a writer.

Jennings' early poetry was published in journals such as Oxford Poetry, New English Weekly, The Spectator, Outposts and Poetry Review, but her first book was not published until she was 27. The lyrical poets she cited as having influenced her were Hopkins, Auden, Graves and Muir. Her second book, A Way of Looking, won the Somerset Maugham award and marked a turning point, as the prize money allowed her to spend nearly three months in Rome, which was a revelation. It brought a new dimension to her religious belief and inspired her imagination.

Regarded as traditionalist rather than an innovator, Jennings is known for her lyric poetry and mastery of form. Her work displays a simplicity of metre and rhyme shared with Philip Larkin, Kingsley Amis and Thom Gunn, all members of the group of English poets known as The Movement. She always made it clear that, whilst her life, which included a spell of severe mental illness, contributed to the themes contained within her work, she did not write explicitly autobiographical poetry. Her deeply held Roman Catholicism coloured much of her work.

She had difficulty managing the practical aspects of her career and life. She became impoverished and struggled with mental health, and her personal difficulties tarnished her critical reputation.  When she was honored by the queen in 1992, she wore a “knitted hat, duffle coat, and canvas shoes”. The tabloids mocked her as “the bag-lady of the sonnets”, and the unfortunate description stayed with her. She spent the later years of her life in various short-term lodgings and in Unity House (8 St Andrew's Lane) in Old Headington. She died in a care home in Bampton, Oxfordshire. She is buried in Wolvercote Cemetery, Oxford.

Her life and career were reviewed in 2018 by Dana Gioia, who said: "Despite her worldly failures, her artistic career was a steady course of achievement. Jennings ranks among the finest British poets of the second half of the twentieth century. She is also England’s best Catholic poet since Gerard Manley Hopkins."

Selected honours and awards
1953: Arts Council of Great Britain Prize for the best first book of poems for Poems
1955: Somerset Maugham Prize for A Way of Looking.
1987: W.H. Smith Literary Award for Collected Poems 1953–1985
1992: Commander of the Order of the British Empire (CBE)
2001: Honorary Doctorate of Divinity from Durham University

Publications

Poetry collections
Poems. Oxford: Fantasy Press, 1953
A Way of Looking. London: André Deutsch, 1955
A Sense of the World. London: André Deutsch, 1958
Song For a Birth or a Death. London: André Deutsch, 1961
The Sonnets of Michelangelo (translated by Jennings). London: Folio Society, 1961
Recoveries. London: André Deutsch, 1964
The Mind has Mountains. London: Macmillan, 1966
The Secret Brother and Other Poems for Children. London: Macmillan, 1966
Collected Poems 1967. London: Macmillan, 1967
The Animals' Arrival. London: Macmillan, 1969
Lucidities. London: Macmillan, 1970
Relationships. London: Macmillan, 1972
Growing Points. Cheadle: Carcanet, 1975
Consequently I Rejoice. Cheadle: Carcanet, 1977
After the Ark. Oxford University Press, 1978
Selected Poems. Cheadle: Carcanet, 1979
Moments of Grace. Manchester: Carcanet, 1980
Celebrations and Elegies. Manchester: Carcanet, 1982
Extending the Territory. Manchester: Carcanet, 1985
  In Shakespere's Company .  The Celandine Press 1985 [limited edition 250 copies]
Collected Poems 1953-1985. Manchester: Carcanet, 1986
An Oxford cycle Poems. Oxford:Thornton's, 1987
Tributes. Manchester: Carcanet, 1989
Times and Seasons. Manchester: Carcanet, 1992
Familiar Spirits. Manchester: Carcanet, 1994
In the Meantime. Manchester: Carcanet, 1996
A Spell of Words: Selected Poems for Children. London: Macmillan, 1997
Praises. Manchester: Carcanet, 1998
Timely Issues. Manchester: Carcanet, 2001
New Collected Poems. Manchester: Carcanet, 2001
Elizabeth Jennings: The Collected Poems. Manchester: Carcanet, 2012
Father to Son: poem

Selections and anthologies edited by Jennings
The Batsford Book of Children's Verse (illustrated). London: Batsford, 1958
An Anthology of Modern Verse: 1940-1960. London: Methuen, 1961
Wuthering Heights and Selected Poems by Emily Brontë. London: Pan Books, 1967
A Choice of Christina Rossetti's Verse. London: Faber and Faber, 1970
The Batsford Book of Religious Verse. London: Batsford, 1981
A Poet's Choice. Manchester: Carcanet, 1996

Criticism
"The Difficult Balance". London Magazine 6.9 (1959): 27–30
"The Restoration of Symbols: The Poetry of David Gascoyne". Twentieth Century 165 (June 1959): 567–577
Let's Have Some Poetry! (for children).  London: Museum Press, 1960
"Poetry and Mysticism: on re-reading Bremond". Dublin Review 234 (1960): 84–91
"The Unity of Incarnation: a study of Gerard Manley Hopkins". Dublin Review 234 (1960): 170–184
Every Changing Shape: Mystical Experience and the Making of Poems. London: André Deutsch, 1961; Manchester: Carcanet, 1996 
Poetry Today (British Council and National British League). London: Longmans, Green and Co., 1961
"Emily Dickinson and the Poetry of the Inner Life". Review of English Literature 3.2 (April 1962): 78–87
Frost (Robert Frost). Edinburgh: Oliver and Boyd, 1964
Christianity and Poetry. London: Burns & Oates, 1965
Reaching into Silence: a study of eight twentieth-century visionaries. New York: Barnes & Noble, 1974
Seven Men of Vision: an appreciation. London: Visa Press, 1976
"The State of Poetry". Agenda 27.3 (Autumn 1989): 40–41

References

External links

 Elizabeth Jennings Project. Profile and works.
 Profile and poems (audio) at the Poetry Archive
 Elizabeth Jennings Papers at Burns Library, Boston College
 Elizabeth Jennings archive at University of Delaware
 Elizabeth Jennings archive at University of Georgetown
 "The Poetry of Elizabeth Jennings" Poetry nation No 5 1975

1926 births
2001 deaths
Burials at Wolvercote Cemetery
Alumni of St Anne's College, Oxford
English Catholic poets
English librarians
British women librarians
English women poets
English Roman Catholics
20th-century English women writers
People educated at Oxford High School, England
People from Boston, Lincolnshire
Roman Catholic writers
20th-century English poets
People from Headington